Lautlos wie sein Schatten (published in 1959) is a detective fiction novel written by Frank Arnau. It was translated into Dutch as both New York na middernacht and Nacht in New York.

Plot 
When James Baldon comes home from a party late at night, he is not able to open the front door of his apartment. The reason: a dead man is blocking his entrance. David Brewer, head of the Homicide Squad, starts the investigation. When it is discovered that the body was moved after being shot, everybody in the building turns out to have an alibi. However, Brewer is convinced that one of the alibis must be false.

1959 German novels
Novels by Frank Arnau
Novels set in New York City